A rocking horse is a toy made in the shape of a horse with rockers on the bottom of its legs.

Rocking horse or Rockinghorse may also refer to:

 Rocking Horse (film), a 1978 film by Yaky Yosha
 Rockinghorse, a 1992 album by Alannah Myles
 Rocking Horse (album), a 2008 album by Kelli Ali
 "Rocking Horse", a song by Gov't Mule from the album Gov't Mule
 "Rockin' Horse", a re-recording of "Rocking Horse" by The Allman Brothers Band from the album Hittin' the Note
 Rocking Horse Studio, an American production company